
Walpole is a civil parish in Norfolk, England. The parish includes the conjoined villages of Walpole St Andrew and Walpole St Peter. Walpole Highway and Walpole Cross Keys are separate civil parishes.

For the purposes of local government, Walpole falls within the district of King's Lynn and West Norfolk.
An electoral ward in the same name exists. This ward had a population at the 2011 Census of 2,322.

Edmund of Walpole was Abbot of Bury St Edmunds from 1248 to 1256.

History 
The partially filled in moat of a former manorial site indicates mediaeval occupation. A brick from an archaeological dig was found to have been used as the board of a game, nine men's morris.

In 1339 the Bishop of Ely  brought criminal proceedings,  
complaining of the breaking up  by local  merchants of the market which he and his 
predecessors had  held at Walpole "time out of mind".

St Peter's Church was used as the parish church of the fictional village of Fenchurch St Paul in the 1970s production of Dorothy L. Sayers' novel The Nine Tailors, starring Ian Carmichael as Lord Peter Wimsey.

Churches

Both St Andrew's and St Peter's are Grade I listed churches.

St Andrew's is a redundant church, now under the care of the Churches Conservation Trust.

St Peter's Church, known as "the Cathedral of the Fens", is a Perpendicular building, and is often regarded as one of England's finest parish churches.

References

External links

 Official church website
 Parish Council website

Civil parishes in Norfolk
King's Lynn and West Norfolk